"Pray" is the third single released from MC Hammer's third album, Please Hammer Don't Hurt 'Em, in August 1990. Produced by MC Hammer, the song heavily samples Prince's 1984 song "When Doves Cry", the first of just a few times that Prince allowed samples of his compositions. The track also interpolates Faith No More's "We Care a Lot". The word "pray" is mentioned 147 times during the song, setting the record for the number of times a song title is repeated in an American Top 40 hit.

"Pray" became MC Hammer's biggest hit on the Billboard Hot 100, where it peaked at number two. The track also became a top-40 hit in multiple countries, and helped make Please Hammer Don't Hurt 'Em the number-one album of the year. The song was certified gold in the U.S. on November 26, 1990 (with sales over 500,000 copies). The song, accompanied with music videos, has appeared on several compilation albums, including: Greatest Hits, Back 2 Back Hits and The Hits. It also appeared in Please Hammer Don't Hurt 'Em: The Movie (1990).

Track listing
"Pray" (Slam the Hammer mix) – 8:01 (aka Maxi-Single Remix)
"Pray" (Slam the Hammer piano dub) – 5:26
"Pray" (Jam the Hammer mix) – 5:00
"Pray" (Hit 'Em Hard mix) – 5:25
"Pray" (Nail 'Em Down chant) – 4:56
"U Can't Touch This" (LP version) – 4:15

Charts

Weekly charts

Year-end charts

Certifications

References

1990 singles
1990 songs
Capitol Records singles
MC Hammer songs
Songs written by MC Hammer